Zain-ud-Din bin Abdul Wahab (14 May 1948 – 7 June 2022) was a Malaysian sprinter. He competed in the men's 100 metres at the 1972 Summer Olympics. He died from a respiratory disease on 7 June 2022, at the age of 74.

References

External links
 

1948 births
2022 deaths
Athletes (track and field) at the 1972 Summer Olympics
Malaysian male sprinters
Olympic athletes of Malaysia
Place of birth missing